Geomdan Sageori Station is an underground station on Line 2 of the Incheon Subway in Seo District, Incheon, South Korea. The station subname is Good Node Hospital. After its opening on July 30, 2016, the survey of passengers showed that Incheon Metropolitan Subway Line 2 had the most passengers, but at present, Seo-gu Office station surpassed the number of users. The "Saegori" means "intersection" in Korean.

Station layout

Station surrounding
 Geomdan Range
 Geomdan Food Town
 Geomdan 1-dong Administrative Welfare Center
 Geomdan Post Office
 Geomdan District
 Incheon Wanggil Elementary School
 Geomdan Middle School
 Incheon Geumgok Elementary School
 Geomdan Snow Cemetery
 Lotte Cinema Geomdan
 Geomdan Elderly Center

External links

 

Metro stations in Incheon
Seoul Metropolitan Subway stations
Railway stations opened in 2016
Seo District, Incheon
Incheon Subway Line 2